Oksefjorden is a fjord in Agder county, Norway. At the north end of the fjord, it joins the Tvedestrandfjorden and the Eikelandsfjorden and at the south end it flows into the Skagerrak. The village of Sandvika lies along the northern shore of the fjord (on Borøya) and the village of Holmesund (on Tverrdalsøya).

See also
 List of Norwegian fjords

References

Fjords of Agder
Tvedestrand
Arendal